Azmy Mehelba (born 26 March 1991) is an Egyptian sport olympic shooter, who began shooting at age 11. Then he was selected to join the Egyptian national men skeet shooting team by the age of 14. Participated in his first international competition at age 15.

Current World ranking number 1, he has been keeping the top of the ranking for long period. He was also ranked World number 1 and World number 2 several times before by the International Shooting Sport Federation (ISSF). He represented his country in many international competitions and has qualified for four consecutive Olympic Games, the 2012 Summer Olympics in London, the 2016 Summer Olympics in Rio de Janeiro, 2020 Summer Olympics in Tokyo and 2024 Summer Olympics in Paris. He was the first Arab & African athlete in all sports to qualify for Rio 2016 where he finished in 10th place (just one target from the finals) and Paris 2024. 

Due to his achievements, unequalled in the history of sports shooting in Egypt, the shooting range at the Alexandria shooting club has been named after him.  His brother, Abdel-Aziz Mehelba, also competed for Egypt at the 2016 Summer Olympics.

Achievements

References

External links

Egyptian male sport shooters
Living people
Olympic shooters of Egypt
Shooters at the 2012 Summer Olympics
Shooters at the 2016 Summer Olympics
1991 births
Competitors at the 2009 Mediterranean Games
Competitors at the 2013 Mediterranean Games
Mediterranean Games competitors for Egypt
Shooters at the 2020 Summer Olympics